Selma is a genus of very small ectoparasitic sea snails, marine gastropod mollusks or micromollusks in   the Eulimidae family.

Species
Species within the genera Selma include:
 Selma succiniola A. Adams, 1863

References

Eulimidae